Cristiano Gomes Machado (born February 20, 1985 in Santana do Livramento, Brazil) is a Brazilian former professional footballer who played as a defender.

Teams
 Atlético Mineiro 2005
 Danubio 2006–2008
 Cerro Largo 2009–2010
 Cerrito 2010–

References
 
 
 Cristiano Gomes Machado at Tenfield Digital 

1985 births
Living people
Brazilian footballers
Association football defenders
Clube Atlético Mineiro players
Danubio F.C. players
Cerro Largo F.C. players
Sportivo Cerrito players
Brazilian expatriate footballers
Brazilian expatriate sportspeople in Uruguay
Expatriate footballers in Uruguay